The 1983 Benson & Hedges Championships was a men's tennis tournament played on indoor carpet courts at the Wembley Arena in London in England that was part of the 1983 Volvo Grand Prix. The tournament was held from 7 November until 12 November 1983. First-seeded John McEnroe won the singles title.

Finals

Singles
 John McEnroe defeated  Jimmy Connors 7–5, 6–1, 6–4
 It was McEnroe's 6th singles title of the year and the 45th of his career.

Doubles
 John McEnroe /  Peter Fleming defeated  Steve Denton /  Sherwood Stewart 6–3, 6–4

References

External links
 ITF tournament edition details

Benson and Hedges Championships
Wembley Championships
Benson and Hedges Championships
Benson and Hedges Championships
Benson and Hedges Championships
Tennis in London